Backgammon is one of the oldest board games.

Backgammon may also refer to:
Backgammon (1979 video game), an Atari 2600 video game
Backgammon (1988 video game), an Atari ST video game
Backgammon (film), a 2015 film by Francisco Orvañanos
Backgammon (album), a 1976 album by Art Blakey

See also